Tommy Conwell (Thomas Edward Conwell) (born January 14, 1962) is an American guitarist, songwriter and performer. He is best known as the frontman for the Philadelphia-based band Tommy Conwell and the Young Rumblers. The band had a #1 US mainstream rock hit in 1988 with "I'm Not Your Man", which also peaked at 74 on the Billboard Hot 100. The original band, consisting of Conwell (guitar, vocals), Paul Slivka (stand-up bass) and Jimmy Hannum (drums), was known for its raw, high-energy live performances which included many classic blues and rock standards. such as "Hideaway" by Freddie King, "Rumble" by Link Wray, "Time Has Come Today" by The Chambers Brothers and "Downtown Train" by Tom Waits, together with several original songs, some of which appeared on the debut album, Walkin' on the Water. Other signature tracks such as "Demolition Derby", which many felt exemplified the band's raw three-piece sound, were abandoned following the shift of the band's sound following the addition of two members, keyboard player Rob Miller and Chris Day on guitar.

Tommy Conwell and the Young Rumblers had moderate success in 1986 with their independently released album, Walkin' On the Water. The band's national major-label debut came when Columbia Records released Rumble in 1988, followed by Guitar Trouble in 1990. A third album was recorded, but the label chose not to release it. Conwell has made that available on his website.

Conwell can still be found doing solo gigs in the Philadelphia area, and in November 2010 and October 2013, he reunited with the Young Rumblers for reunion shows at the Blockley in University City, Philadelphia. On May 10, 2014, he reunited with the Young Rumblers for a show at the Ardmore Music Hall in Ardmore, PA, formerly the 23 East Cabaret, where they had played many years before. The opening act for this reunion was itself a reunion of the Philadelphia band Dynagroove, who has opened for Tommy Conwell and the Young Rumblers in the past.

Tommy Conwell and the Young Rumblers performed at the 2018 HoagieNation festival in Philadelphia on May 26, 2018.

In 2019, Tommy Conwell and the Young Rumblers released their fifth studio album, their first in nearly 30 years, Showboats and Grandstanders.

He is the brother of pro football player Joe Conwell.

Discography

Studio albums 
Tommy Conwell and the Young Rumblers
Walkin' on the Water  (Antenna Records - 1986) 
Rumble (Columbia - 1988) US #103
Guitar Trouble (Columbia - 1990)
Thanks But No Thanks (Neuroticus Maximus) (MCA - Recorded in 1992 but unreleased until 2009)
Showboats and Grandstanders (2019)

Compilations
Rumble / Guitar Trouble (Both Albums On 1 CD) American Beat Records / Re-issue Series (American Beat Records - 2007)

Tommy Conwell and the Little Kings
Sho Gone Crazy  by Tommy Conwell + the Little Kings (Llist Records, 1997)
Hi Ho Silver by Tommy Conwell and the Little Kings (Llist Records, 1999)

Movie soundtracks
Shout - Music from the Original Motion Picture Soundtrack (BMG Music, 1991)
"Devil Call Me Back Home" (Written by Tommy Conwell and performed by Otis Rush)
"More Than A Kiss" (Written and performed by Tommy Conwell)
Chasers - Music from the Original Motion Picture Soundtrack (1994)
"Rock With You" (Written By Tommy Conwell, M. Rauer) Performed By Tommy Conwell and the Young Rumblers

With Buzz Zeemer
1996   Play Thing (Record Cellar Productions)
1998   Delusions of Grandeur (Record Cellar Productions)

Compilations
1987   Patty Smyth, Never Enough, "Isn't It Enough" [credited guitar solo] (Columbia Records)
1994   A Live Christmas Extravaganza, "Run Rudolph Run" (Deko Music)
1997   Last Minute Jam: Volume 2. Minutes to Millennium, "What I'd Say"
1997   Season's Greetings Philadelphia, "Kinda Christmasy" (Record Cellar Productions)
2003   Who's Not Forgotten: FDR's Tribute to The Who, "Long Live Rock" [Vocal performance with the Dipsomaniacs] (Face Down Records)

Singles

References

American rock guitarists
American male guitarists
University of Delaware alumni
Guitarists from Philadelphia
Living people
1962 births